Tsing Yi, sometimes referred to as Tsing Yi Island, is an island in the urban area of Hong Kong, to the northwest of Hong Kong Island and south of Tsuen Wan. Three major bays or harbours, Tsing Yi Lagoon, Mun Tsai Tong and Tsing Yi Bay in the northeast, have been completely reclaimed for new towns.

The island generally is zoned into four quarters: the northeast quarter is a residential area, the southeast quarter is Tsing Yi Town, the southwest holds heavy industry, and the northwest includes a recreation trail, a transportation interchange and some dockyards and ship building industry. The island is in the northwest of Victoria Harbour and part of its coastline is subject to the Protection of the Harbour Ordinance.

Etymology

Tsing Yi literally means "green/ blue/ black clothes", but is also a kind of fish, probably blackspot tuskfish, once abundant in nearby waters. People named the island after the fish. Tsing Yi Tam (Tsing Yi Deep Pool) or Tsing Yi Tam Shan (Tsing Yi Deep Pool Hill) also appeared on some early Chinese maps.

The island was also known as Chun Fa Lok once upon a time, which means the fall of spring flowers, or Chun Fa Island, on some Western maps. Now, Chun Fa Lok is still a place name or a former village on the southeast corner of the island. A government document in the Ming Dynasty named the water near Chun Fa Lok, Chun Fa Yeung,which is the ocean of spring flowers. The Ming navy defeated once pirate fleets there.

In some historical sources, Tsing-I Island is used instead of Tsing Yi Island, and Chung-Hue Island instead of Chun Fa Island.

Administration
Tsing Yi Town, together with Kwai Chung Town, is part of Tsuen Wan New Town in the Kwai Tsing District in the New Territories. Although Tsing Yi Island is a de facto outlying island, it is not accordingly included in the Islands District.

Historically, Tsing Yi Island, with Kwai Chung, were usually in the same administration unit as Tsuen Wan because of their proximity and close-knit neighbourhood. Unlike Kwai Chung, however, whose villages are part of Tsuen Wan Rural Committee, Tsing Yi Island has its own, Tsing Yi Rural Committee. The rural committee was politically significant until the establishment of a District Council and Regional Council (now-abolished), and even less significant since the urban population grew much larger than the rural population.

Population
There were about 4,000 people on the island when the British took the New Territories around 1898. In the following one hundred years, the population has grown to nearly 50 times this size; the 2001 Census calculating that the population of the island was 193,432 in 55,478 households. In an estimation in 2007, there are about 200,400 people. It is expected to grow to 203,300 in the near future. Most of the population live in Tsing Yi Town.

Geography
Tsing Yi Island is a hilly island with Tsing Yi Peak in the south and Liu To Shan in the north east. Small plain can be found surrounding the former Tsing Yi Lagoon in island northeast. The rocks on the island are mainly granite and were exposed due to extensive housing, industrial and infrastructure construction. Although the island is not fallen in the administration of country park, most of the hilly area remains green. The Tsing Yi Peak climbs to and is a barrier separating industrial west and residential east.

Nature
The hilly area of the island largely remains intact and is designated as a green belt. In 1997 a once lost endemic plant, Hong Kong croton, was found in the woodland beneath the highest peak, Tsing Yi Peak, on the island.

History

In the early days, the inhabitants on the island were mostly farmers and fishermen. The major population concentrated in the northeast portion of the island. Farmers grew rice, vegetables and pineapples, while fishermen lived in huts connected by plank walkways in the small harbour of Tsing Yi Tong which stretched far back into the island. Many fishermen also lived on their junks and boats all the time, fishing in the nearby waters. Even as late as the 1970s, Tsing Yi Tong resembled Tai O with its characteristic stilt houses and water vehicles. Like many other fishing villages in Hong Kong, the Tsing Yi dwellers worshipped Tin Hau, the goddess of mercy and the sea. A Tin Hau Temple was built on the shore of Tsing Yi Tong. At the birthday of Tin Hau, fishermen of all nearby waters would come to the Temple for celebrations. The temple was white in color and thus people call it Pak Miu.

From the 1920s onwards, a Chinese company built lime factories on the present site of Greenfield Garden. It is the earliest known industry on the island. The lime industry continued to flourish during the 1950s, and a tanning factory was also founded at the same period. After World War II, other heavy industries moved in as well. In the 1960s, several oil companies moved their oil storage depots onto the island and a Green Island Cement cement plant. CLP later commissioned its 1520MW oil-fired Tsing Yi Power Station in 1969 at Nam Wan due to its proximity to the oil tank farms. Meanwhile, some small shipbuilding companies opened on Tsing Yi, and remain on the north side of the island. In the 1970s, six large-scale companies on the island collectively built the Tsing Yi Bridge to connect Tsing Yi Town and Kwai Chung Town over the Rambler Channel. The bridge was soon transferred to the Hong Kong Government, remaining the sole road connection to the island for more than ten years. Several industrial buildings for light industries were constructed beside the bridge afterward. Several dockyards moved to the west shore of the island at the end of the 1970s.

During the 1950s, Wok Tai Wan on Tsing Yi Island was a paradise for nudists, and hence Tsing Yi was once synonymous with nudism in Hong Kong.

After the establishment of the Tsing Yi Bridge, the Hong Kong government commenced an extensive new town project on the island. Cheung Ching Estate, Cheung Hong Estate and Mayfair Gardens were consequently built in heaps. The vicinity of the Mobil oil storage depot to Mayfair Garden and Cheung Ching Estate once aroused enormous concern for the safety of the residents. Some social workers and residents urged the government to relocate the storage facilities. The government decided to halt the last phase of the Mayfair Garden development scheme. The storage facility remained at the same location until Container Terminal 9 was on the government's agenda.

Later on, the tenor of town development shifted northward. Two fisherman harbours, Tsing Yi Tong and Mun Tsai Tong were reclaimed for residential use. Many fishermen were relocated from their boats parked in the typhoon shelter to the Ching Tao House, a new residential block on land, of Chueng Ching Estate. The land inhabitants were put together into several designated areas so as to re-build their villages. The primary sectors had all died out owing to the drastic town development. Tsing Yi Estate, Cheung On Estate, Cheung Fat Estate, Ching Tai Court and Tsing Yi Garden were built after all reclamations were accomplished. Ching Wah Court was built adjoining to Cheung Hong Estate. At the same time, Tsing Yi Bridge was seriously overburdened and its structure was unable to cope with increasing traffic. There was only a one-way road in each direction on the bridge. Traffic congestion became the burning problem in the community, and subsequently aroused protest. Finally, Tsing Yi North Bridge, a connection to Tsuen Wan Town was built to ease off the congestion, as well as to accommodate the local residential population boom.

Tsing Yi was continually under further development and Greenfield Garden, Serene Garden, Broadview Garden, and Cheung Hang Estate were constructed.

The final decision to relocate Hong Kong International Airport spurred a new series of development: Airport Railway, Ting Kau Bridge to Ting Kau and North New Territories, Tsing Ma Bridge to Ma Wan and Lantau Island, Rambler Channel Bridge to Kowloon and Hong Kong Island, Duplicate Tsing Yi South Bridge on the south side of Tsing Yi Bridge. On the island, new residential projects, Tivoli Garden, Grand Horizon, Mount Haven, Villa Esplanada, Tierra Verde, and Cheung Wang Estate were completed. The final part of reclaimed land near the shore had been laid waste for almost a decade until Tsing Yi Promenade was built in 2004. Local Hong Kong cultural pursuits of Chinese music and dancing, walking and Chinese exercise are in evidence in most evenings.

During 2000 to 2004, Container Terminal 9 was built on the reclaimed southwest shore of the island, together with resident blocks, Rambler Crest. Nearby, and well within sight of Central. Victoria, a controversial new dioxin burning plant was also put into operation during 2004, arousing much concern for the residents of Tsing Yi and Hong Kong island.

Housing estates and villages

Public housing

HOS/PSPS/Sandwich Class Scheme housing

Private housing

Villages
 Chung Mei Lo Uk Village
 Fishermen's Village
 Fung Shue Wo Resite Village
 Lam Tin Resite Village
 St. Paul's Village
 Sun Uk Resite Village
 Tai Wong Ha Resite Village
 Tsing Yi Hui
 Tsing Yi Lutheran Village
 Tsing Yu Resite Village
 Yim Tin Kok Resite
 Sai Shan Village

Hotels
There are three hotels in Tsing Yi Town, at the east of Tsing Yi Island, facing the marvellous view of Rambler Channel and the container terminals. They are:
 Mexan Harbour Hotel,
 Rambler Garden Hotel and
 Rambler Oasis Hotel.

Transport
Tsing Yi Island is a transportation hub in Hong Kong.

Bridges
Eight bridges connect to the island.
 Tsing Yi Bridge to Kwai Chung Town and Kowloon.
 Kwai Tsing Bridge (Duplicate Tsing Yi South Bridge) to Kwai Chung Town and Kowloon.
 Tsing Tsuen Bridge (Tsing Yi North Bridge) to Tsuen Wan Town.
 Ting Kau Bridge to Tuen Mun Town and Yuen Long Town (Route 3).
 Cheung Tsing Bridge to Kowloon and Hong Kong Island (Route 3).
 Tsing Ma Bridge to Ma Wan and Lantau Island (Route 8).
 Tsing Lai Bridge to Lai King station (dedicated MTR viaduct)
 Stonecutters Bridge to Stonecutters Island, Kowloon and Sha Tin Town (Route 8).

Within the island:
 Liu To Bridge (a part of Tsing Yi West Road)

Tunnels
 Cheung Tsing Tunnel (Route 3)
 Nam Wan Tunnel (Route 8)

Railway
Tsing Yi station, at the northeastern part of Tsing Yi Island, in Tsing Yi Town, is served by MTR Tung Chung line and Airport Express. It is also the only rail station on the island.

Bus transport
Tsing Yi is served by an extensive bus network, with routes terminating at different parts of Hong Kong.

There are 9 bus termini on the island:
 Cheung Ching
 Cheung Hang
 Cheung Hong
 Cheung On
 Cheung Wang, formerly known as "Tsing Yan"
 Mayfair Gardens
 Tsing Yi station
 Tsing Yi Estate
 Tsing Yi Ferry

Pier
Before the completion of Tsing Yi Bridge, ferry was the only public transport to mainland Hong Kong. Tsing Yi Pier was built near Tsing Yi Town before the reclamation. The pier followed the change of shoreline owing after reclamation, and moved to the waterfront near Greenfield Garden.

Hovercraft service between Tsuen Wan, Tsing Yi and Central was provided by the former Hongkong and Yaumati Ferry. After the franchise of the company came to an end, Hong Kong and Kowloon Ferry took over the route and operated it.

All ferry services ceased with rapid development of road and rail transport, especially MTR Tung Chung line with its station just a few hundred metres away from the ferry pier. It no longer takes residents to Tsuen Wan and Central. The pier is now open to the public, and continues to be used as a drop-off point for fishermen and tourists, and as a mooring site for government boats.

Religious buildings
 Tin Hau Temple; the temple was originally located near Tsing Yi Tong. Upon reclamation of Tsing Yi, it was moved to Ha Ko Tan, near today's Chung Mei Lo Uk Village.
 Chun Kwan Temple; dedicated to Chun Kwan. The temple was relocated near Tsing Yi Police Station.
 Tsing Tak Tong Tat-more Temple; the Bodhidharma temple in Tsing Yi Lutheran Village.
 Tai Wong Temple, Taoist temple in Tsing Yi Lutheran Village.
 Tai Yam Neong Neong Temple; Taoist temple, dedicated to the Lunar Goddess, Sheung Ngo (嫦娥), located in Tsing Yi Lutheran Village.
 St. Thomas the Apostle Church; the Catholic church building, near Tsing Yi Estate and Tsing Yi Park, was completed in July 1999.
 Tsing Yi Ward of the Church of Jesus Christ of Latter-day Saints (LDS Church); The church is near Maritime Square and St. Pauls Village.
 Tsing Lam Church, Protestant church by the side of Fishermen's Village and St. Paul's Village; the buildings were formally "Fish Marketing Organisation Tsing Yi Fishermen's Children's Primary School".

Education
In the early days, education on the Tsing Yi Island was mostly private. The first public school on the island is Tsing Yi Public School, a primary school founded by villagers and businessmen on the island. In the post-World War II era, Hong Kong Government provides 9-year free education to all children from primary one to secondary three. The public school is then mainly funded by the government. Another school for the children of fishermen, Tsing Yi Fishermen's Children's Primary School, was founded by Fish Marketing Organisation. In 1977, Cheung Ching Estate, the first public housing estates on the island, marked the beginning of the new town on the island. To accommodate new schooling children, three primary schools and Buddhist Yip Kei Nam Memorial College, the first secondary school on the island, were built with the estate. More schools were erected when new estates were completed. In 1999, a post-secondary college, Hong Kong Technical College (Tsing Yi), was completed and provides vocational training for all adults in Hong Kong. In the 2000s, the number of schooling children began to drop and the several schools are facing the fatal fate.

All of Tsing Yi is in Primary One Admission (POA) School Net 66. Within the school net are multiple aided schools (operated independently but funded with government money); no government schools are in this net.

Numerous schools are founded on Tsing Yi Island, namely:

Primary schools
 CNEC Lui Ming Choi Primary School
 Father Cucchiara Memorial School
 HKCSCA Cheung Chi Cheong Memorial Primary School
 HKSYIC&IA Chan Lai So Chun Memorial School
 Delia (Man Kiu) English Primary School
 PLK Castar Primary School
 PLK Chan Yat Primary School
 SKH Ho Chak Wan Primary School
 SKH Tsing Yi Estate Ho Chak Wan Primary School
 SKH Tsing Yi Chu Yan Primary School
 Tsing Yi Public School
 Tsing Yi Fishermen's Children's Primary School (closed)
 Tsing Yi Trade Association Primary School
 Tsuen Wan Trade Association Primary School
 TWGHs Chow Yin Sum Primary School
 TWGHs Wong See Sum Primary School
 YCH Chiu Tsang Hok Wan Primary School

Secondary schools
 Buddhist Yip Kei Nam Memorial College
 Caritas St. Joseph Secondary School
 CCC Yenching College
 Lok Sin Tong Leung Chik Wai Memorial School
 PLK Tsing Yi Secondary School (Skill Opportunity) (closed)
 Po Leung Kuk Lo Kit Sing (1983) College
 Queen's College Old Boys' Association Secondary School
 S. C. Gaw Memorial College

Special schools
 PLK Mr. and Mrs. Chan Pak Keung Tsing Yi School

Institute of Vocational Education
 Hong Kong Institute of Vocational Education (Tsing Yi)

Medical services
The Department of Health operates two general out-patient clinics on the island in Tsing Yi Town. The first one is Tsing Yi Cheung Hong Clinic in Cheung Hong Estate and another is Tsing Yi Town Clinic near Tsing Yi Garden.
There is also one maternal and child health centre, Tsing Yi Maternal and Child Health Centre, on the island. It is just next to Tsing Yi Cheung Hong Clinic.

There is at least one private clinic in each housing estate.

In town planning, Tsing Yi Hospital was supposed to be built near Cheung Hang Estate but the plan was put off owing to financial difficulty of Hospital Authority.

Shopping
All public and private housing estates on the island have their own shopping centres or markets. Cheung Fat Shopping Centre, by Hong Kong Housing Authority was once the largest shopping centre and was later supplanted by MTR Corporation's Maritime Square, as the shopping focus of the island.

Shipbuilding

Tsing Yi is home to Hong Kong United Dockyard, located on the west side since 1980.

Leisure facilities
 Tsing Yi Swimming Pool
 Tsing Yi Sports Ground
 Fung Shue Wo Indoor Recreation Centre
 Tsing Yi Indoor Recreation Centre
 Cheung Fat Indoor Recreation Centre
 Tsing Yi Public Library
 Tsing Yi Park
 Tsing Yi Nature Trail
 Tsing Yi Promenade

People practise T'ai Chi in Tsing Yi Promenade near Maritime Square in Tsing Yi Town in the early morning hours. Some gather and practise dancing in the playground near Tsing Yung House of Cheung Ching Estate.

See also

 Tsing Yi Bamboo Theatre
 List of islands and peninsulas of Hong Kong
 Kam Chuk Kok
 List of places in Hong Kong
 Tsing Yi Rural Committee
 My Home Purchase Plan

References

External links

Satellite image of Tsing Yi by Google Maps

 
Restricted areas of Hong Kong red public minibus
Islands of Hong Kong
Populated places in Hong Kong